Pachyschelomyia is a genus of horse flies in the family Tabanidae.

Species
Pachyschelomyia notopleuralis Barretto, 1950

References

Tabanidae
Brachycera genera
Diptera of South America